Turridrupa albofasciata is a species of sea snail, a marine gastropod mollusk in the family Turridae, the turrids.

Description
THe length of the shell attains 18 mm.

Distribution
This marine species occurs the Philippines, Hawaii and Papua New Guinea.

References

 Liu, J.Y. [Ruiyu] (ed.). (2008). Checklist of marine biota of China seas. China Science Press. 1267 pp.

External links
 Smith EA. 1877. Diagnoses of new species of Pleurotomidae in the British Museum. Ann Mag. Nat Hist. 4 (19):488–501

albofasciata
Gastropods described in 1877